Dame Nicola Anne Cullum  (born 6 June 1962) is a Professor of Nursing at the University of Manchester.

Education
Cullum was educated at the University of Liverpool where she was awarded a Bachelor of Science degree in Pharmacology in 1984 and a Doctor of Philosophy degree in Pharmacology in 1990. She became a Registered General Nurse (RGN) in 1985.

Research and Career
Cullum completed postdoctoral research at the University of Surrey and the University of Liverpool. Between 1994 and 2011 she worked at the University of York. Her research is primarily on wound care.

Awards and honours
Cullum was made Dame Commander of the Order of the British Empire for services to nursing research and wound care in the 2013 Birthday Honours. She was an Inaugural National Institute for Health Research (NIHR) Senior Investigator (2008–2012, renewed 2013) and was made a Fellow of both the Academy of Medical Sciences (FMedSci) and the American Academy of Nursing (FAAN) in 2012.

Publications
Cullum has over 160 articles listed on Web of Science that have been cited over 4000 times giving her an h-index of 37. Her top three most cited articles are:

References

External links
 

People from Leeds
Dames Commander of the Order of the British Empire
Living people
1962 births
English nurses
Nursing researchers
Nursing educators
NIHR Senior Investigators